The 4th Brigade Combat Team, 1st Infantry Division is an inactive Infantry Brigade Combat Team. Active from 2006 through 2015, the BCT served in Iraq from 2007 to 2008 and from 2009 to 2010, in Afghanistan from 2012 to 2013, and in a variety of theater security cooperation activities in Africa from 2014 to 2015. The BCT was inactivated in 2015 as part of force reductions.

History

Activation
On 12 January 2006, the 4th Brigade Combat Team held its activation ceremony. The activation was part of the transformation of the US Army to a new modular force structure. Under the new force structure, all divisions would activate a fourth maneuver brigade and otherwise reorganize their other assets. Formations representing the 2nd Battalion, 16th Infantry; 1st Battalion, 28th Infantry; 1st Squadron, 4th Cavalry; 2nd Battalion, 32nd Field Artillery; 4th Brigade Special Troops Battalion; and 701st Brigade Support Battalion, participated in the ceremony, which signified the transfer of the brigade from inactive to active status. The brigade was expected to be combat ready in 12 months after its activation. When the brigade was fully functioning, 3,500 soldiers and 1,700 family members were expected to call Fort Riley, Kansas home.

Operation Iraqi Freedom
In 2007, 2nd Squadron, 4th Cavalry and the 610th Brigade Support Battalion were reflagged as the 1st Squadron, 4th Cavalry and the 701st Brigade Support Battalion respectively. The 4th Brigade Combat Team deployed from Fort Riley to the Middle East in support of Operation Iraqi Freedom in February 2007.

In August 2009, The 4th Brigade deployed again to the Salah ad Din Province, Iraq in support of Operation Iraqi Freedom.

Operation Enduring Freedom
From May 2012 through February 2013, the brigade deployed to Afghanistan, where it operated in Ghazni and Paktika provinces.

Announcement of inactivation
On 25 June 2013, Army Chief of Staff, General Raymond Odierno, said that the 4th Brigade Combat Team of the 1st Infantry Division will be inactivated by 2017. The move is part of the Army's plans to reduce its overall strength by 80,000 soldiers to 490,000. The cuts were already planned by the military before federal budget reductions were put in place in March 2013. The BCT's units inactivated during ceremonies between April and Jun 2015.

The 2nd Battalion, 16th Infantry will be reactivated as part of the 3rd Brigade Combat Team, 3rd Infantry Division at Fort Benning, GA. The 1st Squadron, 4th Cavalry will be reactivated as part of the 1st Brigade Combat Team, 1st Infantry Division.

External links
4th Brigade Combat Team, 1st Infantry Division (Mechanized) "Dragon Brigade" (accessed 24 January 2010)

References

Military units and formations established in 2006
Infantry 001 04
Infantry 001 04